Jaculinidae is a family of bryozoans belonging to the order Cheilostomatida.

Genera:
 Jaculina Jullien, 1903
 Pirabasoporella Zágoršek, Ramalho, Berning & Araújo Távora, 2014

References

Cheilostomatida